Lookout Mountain in Los Angeles County, California is a  peak on the shoulder of Mount San Antonio ("Mount Baldy").

The peak was used by Albert A. Michelson to measure the speed of light in 1925–1929. To do so, a 21.5 mile baseline was established in 1923 by U.S. Coast and Geodetic Survey, with accuracy of 1 part in 11 million, in Pasadena at the base of Mount Baldy, roughly to Rancho Cucamonga at the base of Mount Wilson. It may have been the most accurate baseline ever determined, at the time. Coast and Geodetic Survey then used the baseline to triangulate the distance to the Mount Wilson Observatory, with distance error about 1 part in 5 million, and Michelson measured light travel time between the stations with a rotating mirror apparatus. The concrete piers on Lookout Mountain used for the Michelson observations still exist.

The first fire lookout in the Angeles National Forest was built there in 1914 and stood until it burned in 1927.

References

Sources

External links
Lookout Mountain hike, via Caltech
Lookout Mountain at Summit Post

San Gabriel Mountains